That's What I Am is a 2011 American comedy-drama film directed by Michael Pavone and starring Ed Harris and Chase Ellison. It received a limited release on April 29, 2011, and was later released on DVD on July 15, 2011.

Plot
Set in one of the Jefferson Middle Schools of California in 1965, the film follows a story of schoolboy Andrew "Andy" Nichol who is paired up with the school's reject, Stanley "Big G" Minors for a project assigned by a teacher named Mr. Steven Simon. As the project goes on, Andy and Stanley form a close bond. While the project is going, a rumor starts spreading around the school that Mr. Simon is a homosexual. One of the school's bullies, Jason Freel, tells his father, who goes to the school principal to ask if the rumor is true. The principal does not know, so she confronts Mr. Simon, who says that being a homosexual should not change his job. Mr. Simon does not confirm nor deny that he is a homosexual. Jason Freel's father threatens to tell the whole community about the rumor, which he takes as a fact.

While that is happening, Andy's crush, Mary Clear, falls in love with him. Ricky Brown, the school's bully who is Mary's ex-boyfriend, threatens Andy that if he goes near Mary, he'll kill him because he still likes Mary. Ignoring this fact, Andy asks Mary if she wants to go steady, and she says yes. While trying to ask Mary, Ricky shows up to the scene and tries to beat Andy up, but before he gets to it Mary steps in and tells Ricky to leave Andy alone. Stanley is also revealed to have wanted to perform in the school talent show, and even though Stanley's best friend Norman Gunmeyer does not condone it, Stanley participates anyway. At the show, Andy realizes that Norman isn't there, and bikes over to his house to ask him to go. Norman puts up a fight but then decides to go. When Stanley starts to perform, Ricky has a tomato in his hand and is planning on throwing the tomato at Stanley. Andy walks up to him and tells him not to throw the tomato. Andy then kicks him in the groin, and Ricky screams in anguish, yet Mr. Simon does not punish Andy but rather congratulates him. Andy also finds out that Mr. Simon is moving to Florida, and even though Andy tries to stop him, Mr. Simon's mind is set. Andy and his English class who have been taught by Mr. Simon surprise him by putting flowers in his car. In the end, it shows the "yearbook" of the school, and what happens to the characters.

Cast
Ed Harris as Mr. Simon
Molly Parker as Mrs. Nichol
Amy Madigan as Principal Kelner
Chase Ellison as Andy Nichol
Randy Orton as Ed Freel
Daniel Roebuck as Mr. Nichol
Mia Rose Frampton as Mary Clear
Cameron Deane Stewart as Carl Freel
Daniel Yelsky as Norman Gunmeyer
Alexander Walters as Stanley "Big G" Minor
Camille E. Bourgeois III as Jason Freel
Jordan Reynolds as Ricky Brown
Brett Lapeyrouse as Bruce Modak
Greg Kinnear as Narrator (uncredited)

Reception
In its limited theatrical release of 10 theaters, the film grossed about $6,400 for three days. The film holds a 60% rating on Rotten Tomatoes. Alison Willmore of The A.V. Club gave the film a score of D+ praising its way of combining To Kill A Mockingbird with The Sandlot but failing to bring a climax. The AXS's Joseph Airdo compared it to last year's Flipped.

The Hollywood Reporters David Rooney was quoted saying that:The film has a crisp, clean look, with decent period production values. But its chief distinction is Harris’ empathetic work in an uncharacteristically subdued role, striking stirring notes especially in some strong scenes with his real-life wife Madigan.

Film School Rejects gave a film a D− praising the teen fun and realistic relationships but criticizing painful acting and loose end script.

Film Journal International didn't praised the film for anything, but rather accused the director of presenting a female character in a film as a slut.

Michael Leader of the Den of Geek gave the film 1 out of 5 stars criticizing the over the top acting of Ed Harris and Randy Orton while The New York Times compared it to a mix of Hallmark movie and The Wonder Years.

References

External links

That's What I Am on Christian Answers.net

2011 films
2011 comedy-drama films
American comedy-drama films
2010s English-language films
American LGBT-related films
LGBT-related comedy-drama films
Films set in schools
WWE Studios films
2011 LGBT-related films
2010s American films